Francisco Adolpho "Chico" Serra (born 3 February 1957) is a Brazilian racing driver.

Biography 
Serra made his mark in International motorsport when he won the 1979 British Formula 3 Championship, one season after his compatriot Nelson Piquet had won the title. His performance caught the eye of Emerson Fittipaldi, he himself a British Formula 3 Championship winner in 1969, who signed him for his Formula One team Fittipaldi.

Serra debuted alongside Keke Rosberg on 15 March 1981 in Long Beach, finishing seventh. Serra's result would turn out to be the best one for the team over the rest of the season. In 1982, with Rosberg moving to Williams, Fittipaldi resized the operation, fielding only one car for Serra. Serra scored his first championship point for finishing sixth in the 1982 Belgian Grand Prix. At the 1982 Canadian Grand Prix, Serra and countryman Raul Boesel made headlines for having a short scuffle after the qualifying session. Serra was furious at Boesel for blocking his last flying lap after waving Rosberg by. Boesel denied that this was intentional. Fittipaldi's lack of pace meant that Serra occasionally failed to qualify. As the best of the non-qualified drivers, he was in contention for starting the 1982 Swiss Grand Prix after Ferrari withdrew Patrick Tambay's entry but FIA rejected Serra's request on the ground that Ferrari announced Tambay's retirement, who on Sunday morning did not feel well enough to race, too late.  

In 1983 Serra raced for Arrows. Despite scoring three top-ten finishes in his first four outings with the team, he was released after the 1983 Monaco Grand Prix and replaced with Thierry Boutsen. Overall Serra participated in 33 Formula One World Championship Grands Prix.

Following the end of his Formula One career, Serra made one CART Champ Car start in 1985 at the Portland International Raceway for Ensign Racing but suffered an engine failure.

Serra has participated in Brazilian stock car racing since the 1980s and was series champion in 1999, 2000 and 2001. 

Serra was a good friend of Ayrton Senna as they both climbed the motorsport ladder at the same time. In 1981 Serra recommend Senna to Ralph Firman, who had his team in the Formula Ford 1600. In 1994 Serra refused to attend Senna's funeral. In an interview with the Brazilian magazine Grid he said that he disliked the hypocrisy surrounding the event. "There was too much pretence, which made me sick. Some people came a long way just to use the situation for their own good. These people never helped him, and they wanted to make us believe that they were great friends who were suffering so much. Going to the funeral was more beneficial to them than winning at Indianapolis".

Serra is the father of racing driver Daniel Serra.

Complete Formula One World Championship results
(key)

References

Brazilian racing drivers
Brazilian Formula One drivers
Fittipaldi Formula One drivers
Arrows Formula One drivers
European Formula Two Championship drivers
British Formula Three Championship drivers
Stock Car Brasil drivers
1957 births
Living people
Formula Ford drivers
European Le Mans Series drivers
Brazilian Champ Car drivers

Team Joest drivers